is a Japanese rock band from Fukuoka, Japan. Its members are Kaba, Nishi, and Yama.

Immediately after forming in January 2004, their height of degree of completion of music is appraised and acquires a grand prix in the audition of local end in Fukuoka. After that, Snowkel focused on live activity in Fukuoka. In December 2004, Snowkel had their first live gig in Fukuoka where they sold independent production board CD of themselves. In 2005, still focused on live activity, Snowkel produced a D board mini-album called  and released their debut single .

In 2006, the band earned a major record label deal with Sony Music Japan and released their first studio album called SNOWKEL SNORKEL on April 26, 2006. Snowkel Snorkel contains their released singles "Tabibito Beginner", "Namikaze Satellite", and "Ooki Na Mizutamari".

On October 3, 2007, their second album EQ was released featuring songs from their singles: "Solar Wind", "Bye-Bye×Hello", "Tenkiyohō" and "Kiseki"; along with 8 new songs for a total of 12 songs.
Their songs feature in a few anime series:
 "Namikaze Satellite" as the seventh opening for Naruto
 "Solar Wind" as the second ending for Kiba
 "Kiseki" as the sixth ending for Gintama.

Their third album, EYE, was released at December 15, 2015 after reunited back in 2014.

Members
 Nishimura Shinya "Nishi" (guitar, vocals)
 Kabamura Masami "Kaba" (bass)
 Yamada Masato "Yama" (drums)

Discography

Indies
  (December 18, 2004)
  (June 1, 2005)

Singles
  (November 2, 2005)
  (January 1, 2006)
  (April 5, 2006)
 solar wind (August 23, 2006)
 Bye-Bye×Hello (January 1, 2007)
  (April 8, 2007)
  (August 8, 2007)
  (July 9, 2008)
 RESTART/FIND（May 24, 2015）
 （Dec 3, 2017）

Albums
 Snowkel Snorkel (April 26, 2006)
 
 
 
 
 62
 
 
 100,000 hp
 
 REWIND
 

 EQ (October 3, 2007)
 Another World
 
 solar wind
 
 
 
 
 
 
 Bye-Bye×Hello
 
 

 EYE（December 16, 2015）
 PLASMA
 QUEST
 REVOLVER
 RESTART 〜ALBUM VERSION〜
 EYE
 REGRET
 CINEMA
 OPEN
 CLOSE
 HIGHWAY

References

 Snowkel Official Site

Sony Music Entertainment Japan artists
Japanese rock music groups
Musical groups from Fukuoka Prefecture